Balshaw's CE High School is a comprehensive Church of England secondary school located on Church Road in Leyland, England.

Location
It is situated on Church, Road in Leyland, England just south of the B5248 in the east of Leyland, close to the West Coast Main Line, and 546 yards (500m) west of the M6.

History and events

Foundation
The school was founded by Richard Balshaw in 1782.  He established a high school called Golden Hill - until the 1920s that school was the original school for Balshaw's pupils. In 1922 work started on building a new school on a 5-acre site.

Grammar school
Opened in 1931, it was Balshaw's Grammar School until 1972, when after the abolition of the 11 plus exam, it became Balshaw's High School.

Comprehensive
In 1972 the school partnered with Parklands High School opening Runshaw College, joining to combine both the schools' sixth forms. The school later abandoned its Grammar status in favour of comprehensive status in September 1972, becoming Balshaw's High School. In 1994 the school became a Church of England school.

Newer expansions

2013 
 Construction of the 3G Astro multi-sport pitch began after students fund-raised for the area.

2014 
 Construction of the 3G Astro was completed before the new intake arrived.

2016 
 A new PE building was constructed which housed a fitness suite and PE office as well as new corridors to make access around the department easier.
 Old corridors and areas in the PE and Drama departments such as the backstage passages and storage rooms were renovated along with the re-modeling of the Old Gym into a new dance studio. The changing rooms were also greatly improved and toilets were added.
 Fire systems were fully replaced with new smoke detectors and alarms in every room. Strobe lights were also added in areas where the alarms may not be able to be heard such as music rooms.
 New electronic door access systems were installed along with basic CCTV

2017 
 New equipment for the music department such as new music instruments for practice rooms and recording rooms.
 The music department was planned to be fully expanded in 2017 but plans were later scrapped

2018 
 New IT upgrades such as new computers began, many old computers from the school's main computer rooms were removed and replaced with new all-in-one desktop PCs running Windows 10.

2019 
 New security fencing was erected outside the school and CCTV coverage was increased.

Traditions

House system
The school is split into traditional houses. The house system consists of all years, all of which have four divisions (see below). These divisions are named after four areas of Lancashire, and are managed by learning managers.

The houses are managed by separate staff:
 Cuerden - Mrs Coburn
 Farington - Mr Riley
 Worden - Mr Jennings
 Clayton - Mrs Lupton

Headteachers
Jo Venn finished her stint as headteacher at the end of the 2014 spring term; having been in the position from 1995 where she took over from Paul Ingram. Venn was the first female headteacher throughout the school's history. From September 2014, Steven Haycocks became headteacher, making him the first new headteacher in 20 years.

School mottos

The school motto is Non Sibi Sed Aliis which is Latin for "Not for oneself, but for others". However the school has now adopted the somewhat common motto "Aiming at Excellence". Another commonly used motto used within the school, primarily during assemblies, is "If you don't have anything nice to say, don't say anything at all".

Ofsted inspections
The school was formally inspected by the HM Inspectorate of Schools on Thursday 4 June 2009, the previous one being in 2006, and achieved 'Good' status. The latest inspection took place in 2013 where the school was promoted to 'Outstanding' status.

Eco-Schools
Balshaw's is part of the Eco-Schools scheme in Lancashire. This came with a lot of development, by way of recording waste usage, electricity, gas, and how well the school does economically with regard to funds, budgets and the environment. This meant creating new targets and innovating energy use for better sustainability. On 2 July 2009, the first Eco event held was an "Eco-Day", in which the pupils worked with eco-friendly materials and learnt about how to lead environmentally friendly lifestyles. Subsequent to this, further Eco events and projects have been held. One of the recent events was their Eco Garden Party in 2014.

Notable former pupils
 Tisha Merry, actress, currently known for playing Steph Britton in Coronation Street since 2013.
 Tom Bidwell, TV scriptwriter, nominated for an Academy Award in 2011, for his film Wish 143
 Marcus Bleasdale, photo journalist
 Clarke Carlisle footballer for Burnley F.C., achieving 10 A-grades at GCSE
 Bryn Hargreaves, rugby league player
 Trevor Mather, Chief Executive since 2006 of ThoughtWorks
 Danny Mayor, footballer
 Chris Tuson, rugby league player
 Phil Jones, footballer for Manchester United F.C.(formerly Blackburn Rovers F.C.)
 Amy Evans, artist

Balshaw's Grammar School
 John Aldington, physicist who did important work at Siemens in Preston on the development of mercury-vapour lamps
 Ian Bleasdale, TV actor
 Prof Thomas Hope, Professor of French Language and Romance Philology from 1968 to 1987 at the University of Leeds
 Sir John Lawton CBE, Chief Executive from 1999 to 2005 of the Natural Environment Research Council
 David Loftus MBE, Chaplain to the Royal Military School of Music
 Sylvia Mylroie, Baroness Jay of Ewelme, Chair of the Pilgrim Trust, and married to Michael Jay, Baron Jay of Ewelme
 Sir James Sharples, Chief Constable from 1989 to 1998 of Merseyside Police

Leyland Grammar School
 Thomas Walker (Australian politician)

References

External links
 

Church of England secondary schools in the Diocese of Blackburn
Secondary schools in Lancashire
Educational institutions established in 1931
Schools in South Ribble
Voluntary controlled schools in England
 
Leyland, Lancashire
1931 establishments in England